Comptons of Soho is a gay pub in London. Situated at 51–53 Old Compton Street in the heart of Soho's 'Gay village', Comptons has been an integral part of London's gay scene since June 1986.

History
The building was designed by architects W. A. Williams and Hopton and was built as The Swiss Hotel in 1890. Williams and Hopton exhibited their design for the Swiss Hotel in 1890 at the Royal Academy. An illustration of the original building was published in The Builder of 25 October 1890.

By the 1950s the Swiss Hotel had been renamed to "The Swiss Tavern" and was known as "not entirely straight". By 1986 the Swiss Tavern had been renovated and renamed to "Comptons of Soho" as a gay bar. In November 2006 it celebrated its twentieth anniversary, at which time, QX Magazine referred to it as "The Grand Dame of Queer Street".

Comptons is a large, Victorian styled pub with two bars. The ground floor bar is a horse-shoe bar and it attracts a varied gay male crowd, including many tourists. Upstairs, there is a lounge area.

As of August 2015, it is operated by the Faucet Inn pub company.

References

LGBT pubs in London
Pubs in Soho